Empis algecirasensis is a species of fly in the family Empididae. It is included in the subgenus Xanthempis. It is found in the Palearctic.

References

Empis
Asilomorph flies of Europe
Insects described in 1909
Taxa named by Gabriel Strobl